Carl Julius Milde (16 February 1803, Hamburg - 19 November 1875, Lübeck) was a German painter, curator and art restorer.

Life 
His father was a grocer whose business had been nearly ruined by the French Occupation. After a financially difficult youth, his desire to improve himself led to art lessons with Gerdt Hardorff  and Siegfried Bendixen and a lasting association with the artistic family of Johannes Michael Speckter. Later he, Otto Speckter and Erwin Speckter toured Northern Germany with the support of art historian Carl Friedrich von Rumohr. They were all most impressed with the old Hanseatic city of Lübeck. On Rumohr's advice, Milde went to study at the Dresden Academy of Fine Arts in 1824. Later, he studied briefly at the Academy of Fine Arts, Munich, followed by a visit to Italy.

From 1830 to 1832, he returned to Italy, visiting every major city, but staying longest in Rome, where he came under the influence of Friedrich Overbeck and the Nazarene movement. Although he continued to travel, Hamburg remained his home for most of the 1830s, making a name for himself with portraits and church paintings. In 1835, he completed a series of frescoes at the Mayor's official residence, which had been started by his friend Erwin Speckter but left incomplete at the latter's early death. As an amateur scientist and naturalist, he also illustrated several medical/anatomical texts.

Career in Lübeck
In 1838, shortly after getting married, he moved to Lübeck where he took a position as a drawing instructor at the Katharineum and became a Professor in 1841. He also pursued his scientific hobbies, documenting and cataloguing items for the Lübecker naturhistorische Museum, where he served as a curator for thirty years. Among his more interesting projects was helping to assemble the museum's first gorilla skeleton. 

Increasingly though, his focus turned to documenting and saving the city's artistic and architectural heritage. He concentrated on the rescue and restoration of Medieval interior pieces and stained glass, laying a foundation for the collection of altarpieces at St. Anne's Museum. In 1865, while working at the Hofkirche in Semlow, he attracted the attention of Crown Prince Frederick and was commissioned to work on the windows between the towers at Cologne cathedral.

Despite increasing senility during his last six years of life, he continued to work and serve in all of his official capacities. His many collections are still preserved at their respective institutions in Lübeck. A street in Hamburg's Barmbek-Nord district is named after him.

Books 
 Lübecker ABC, 26 etchings by C. J. Milde, Bollmann, Lübeck, Self-published 1857 (2nd. ed. Grautoff, 1873; 3rd. ed. Nöhring, 1926).
 Aus Lübecks alten Tagen, Verlag Bernhard Nöhring, Lübeck 1908.

References

Further reading 
 Willibald Leo von Lütgendorff-Leinburg: Carl Julius Milde, Gebrüder Borchers, Lübeck 1908
 Harald Richert: "Der Künstler und Kunsthistoriker Carl Julius Milde" In: Nordelbingen. Vol.46 (1977), pgs.49–61.
 Jenns Eric Howaldt: "Carl Julius Milde und die Entdeckung des mittelalterlichen Lübeck". In: Kunst und Kultur Lübecks im 19. Jahrhundert. Museum für Kunst und Kulturgeschichte der Hansestadt Lübeck, 1981 pgs. 287–289.
 Suzanne Grosskopf: "Milde, Carl Julius". In: Lübecker Lebensläufe, ed. by Alken Bruns, Karl Wachholtz Verlag, Neumünster 1993, pgs.261–265.
 Jan Zimmermann: Das alte Lübeck lächelt einem so treuherzig ins Gesicht. Carl Julius Milde und sein „Lübecker ABC“. Lübeck 2007.
 Gerhard Ahrens: "Carl Julius Mildes Wirken für den Lübecker Geschichtsverein". In: Zeitschrift des Vereins für Lübeckische Geschichte und Altertumskunde, Vol.83, Verlag Schmidt-Römhild, Lübeck, 2003, pgs.271–278.

External links 

 

1803 births
1875 deaths
German male painters
German curators
19th-century German painters
19th-century German male artists